Francesco de Angelis  (born 11 September 1960) is an Italian yachtsman. He was the first and so far only non-angloamerican skipper to win the Louis Vuitton Cup in Auckland in 2000 with Luna Rossa (ITA45).

Biography 
Francesco was born in Naples on September 11, 1960. Over the course of his career, he has won several prestigious regattas, including six world championships with different classes, one Admiral's Cup (1995), three Sardinia Cups, two Swan Cups, three Middle Sea Race Trophy (2005, 2013 and 2015),the Giraglia Trophy in 2018, the Aegean 600 (2021). He has won two European championships and nine Italian championships with different classes.

In 2000, as the skipper and helmsman of Luna Rossa, he won the Louis Vuitton Cup and challenged Team New Zealand’s Black Magic (NZL60) in the XXX America’s Cup. In the XXXI America’s Cup in 2003, still as Luna Rossa’s skipper and helmsman, he reached the semi-finals but lost to One World. In the XXXII America’s Cup in 2007, he served as team director and skipper for Luna Rossa and reached, again, the Louis Vuitton final after beating BMW Oracle Racing 5–1. During the XXXIII America’s Cup, he was a commentator for Italian broadcaster La7,worked as a guest expert for Sky during the 2012 London Olympics and Rai for the XXXVI America's Cup, Auckland 2021. For his distinction in sports, Francesco has been awarded four gold medals from the Italian National Olympic Committee. He was also named as an honorary Officer of the New Zealand Order of Merit, for services to yachting and New Zealand–Italy relations, in the 2000 Queen's Birthday Honours.

Achievements

Other results
 One Ton Cup  (1989, 1992)
Italian Championships
 J/24  (1984, 1985, 1987)
 Star  (1985)

Honours and awards
   dal CONI (4 times)
  Honorary Officer of the New Zealand Order of Merit

See also
 Italy at the America's Cup

References

External links
 Francesco de Angelis at ISAF

1960 births
Italian male sailors (sport)
Living people
America's Cup sailors
Luna Rossa Challenge sailors
2000 America's Cup sailors
2003 America's Cup sailors
2007 America's Cup sailors
World champions in sailing for Italy
Sportspeople from Naples
Officers of the New Zealand Order of Merit
J/24 class world champions